John Parker is a former American football player and coach. He served as the head football coach at the University of Minnesota–Morris (1996–1997), Cheyney University of Pennsylvania (1998–2001), and Cumberland University in Lebanon, Tennessee (2004–2005). Parker was also the head coach for the Missouri Monsters of the Ultimate Indoor Football League (UIFL) in 2013.

Since retiring from coaching, he has opened up his own public relations firm.

Head coaching record

College

References

Year of birth missing (living people)
Living people
Ball State Cardinals football players
Cheyney Wolves football coaches
Cumberland Phoenix football coaches
East Tennessee State Buccaneers football coaches
MacMurray Highlanders football coaches
Minnesota Morris Cougars football coaches
Nebraska–Omaha Mavericks football coaches
Tennessee State Tigers football coaches
Washington and Lee Generals football coaches
Missouri Valley College alumni